Cian Mahony (born 31 December 1974) is an Irish former rugby union player.

Career
Mahony played for Cork Constitution in the amateur All-Ireland League, and made seven appearances for Munster between 1997 and 1999, including in the 1998–99 and 1999–2000 Heineken Cup's, but having found first-team opportunities limited with the province, Mahony turned away from professional rugby, though he still played for Con.

References

External links
Munster Profile

Living people
1974 births
Rugby union players from County Cork
Irish rugby union players
Cork Constitution players
Munster Rugby players
Rugby union centres